Sébastien Lecornu (born 11 June 1986) is a French politician who served as Minister of the Armed Forces in the government of Prime Minister Élisabeth Borne since 20 May 2022. 

After leaving The Republicans (LR) in 2017, Lecornu has been a member of Renaissance. Lecornu was President of the Departmental Council of Eure from 2015 to 2017. In government, he served as Secretary of State to the Minister of the Ecological and Inclusive Transition (2017–2018) and Minister of Local Authorities (2018–2020) and as Minister of the Overseas (2020–2022).

Early life and education

A native of Eaubonne, Val-d'Oise, he joined the Union for a Popular Movement (UMP) in 2002 and studied at Panthéon-Assas University.

In 2005, he became a parliamentary assistant to Franck Gilard, the member of the National Assembly for Eure's 5th constituency; Lecornu was, at the time, the youngest parliamentary assistant in the National Assembly. In 2008, he became an advisor to Secretary of State for European Affairs Bruno Le Maire; at age 22 Lecornu was the youngest advisor to an official in the government of Prime Minister François Fillon.

He is a member of the National Gendarmerie operational reserve with the rank of lieutenant. He was appointed colonel as a reserve specialist in the fall of 2017.

Political career

Career in local politics
In the 2014 municipal election, Lecornu was elected Mayor of Vernon. 
The combination of two executive mandates being incompatible, he abandoned the town hall of Vernon on 4 December 2015.

Following the 2015 departmental elections in which he was elected councillor for the canton of Vernon alongside Catherine Delalande, Lecornu became President of the Departmental Council of Eure.

Lecornu highlights his refusal to raise taxes and rigorous management of public money. Mediapart points out that the hunt for RSA fraudsters has been - with great communication support - the flagship policy pursued by the department since the arrival of Lecornu. It is also closing two priority education colleges, which it justifies by their low occupancy rates.

Secretary of State

In 2017, Lecornu was appointed to be a Secretary of State to the Minister for the Ecological and Inclusive Transition by President Emmanuel Macron.

Lecornu was then suspended from his duties within The Republicans by the party and disciplinary exclusion proceedings were brought against him. He was excluded from LR on 31 October 2017, with Gérald Darmanin, also a member of the government, and the member of the National Assembly, Franck Riester and Thierry Solère. He then joined La République En Marche!.

Nicolas Hulot delegated issues related to energy in general to Lecornu. In particular, he was entrusted with several sensitive files such as the closure of the Fessenheim Nuclear Power Plant, the opening of the Flamanville's EPR, or the Cigeo nuclear waste landfill project in Bure.

Minister of Local Authorities
On 16 October 2018, Lecornu was appointed Minister of Local Authorities to the  Minister of Territorial Cohesion and Relations with Local Authorities, Jacqueline Gourault.

On 14 January 2019, Lecornu was appointed with Emmanuelle Wargon to lead the "great national debate", organised in order to get out of the crisis caused by the yellow vests movement.

Minister of the Overseas
On 6 July 2020, Lecornu was appointed Minister of the Overseas in the Castex government. In this capacity, he held crisis talks on the French Caribbean territory of Guadeloupe in late 2021, in an effort to defuse tensions amid unrest stemming from the government's handling of the COVID-19 pandemic there. He also announced that France would be willing to discuss autonomy for Guadeloupe.

Minister of the Armed Forces

On 20 May 2022, Lecornu was appointed Minister of the Armed Forces in the Borne government. 

International crises

Early in his tenure, Lecornu and Minister of Foreign Affairs Catherine Colonna travelled to Niger together to seal a regional redeployment, making the country the hub for French troops in the Sahel region.

While the 2022 Russian invasion of Ukraine was raging and the NATO allies were in the midst of supplying arms to the victim, Lecornu stated at the end of December 2022 in an official visit to Kyiv that the two problems of maintenance and training were the reason for which the Leclerc tanks would stay at home. There were other troubling signs that all was not well with the effort to aid Ukraine. For example, although the CAESAR mobile artillery system had proven very useful to the June 2022 bombardment and recapture of Snake Island and dominated the battle elsewhere, the Ukrainians were having difficulty with the maintenance of the 18 systems and the solution was problematic. Ukrainian defence minister Oleksiy Reznikov hoped that French tradesmen could be sent to Ukraine to service the artillery pieces.

Military procurement

In December 2022, Lecornu and Mariusz Błaszczak signed an agreement between France and Poland on the 575 million euros ($611.69 million) sale of two Airbus Defence and Space observation satellites to Poland.

References

1986 births
Living people
Paris 2 Panthéon-Assas University alumni
21st-century French politicians
Departmental councillors (France)
Presidents of French departments
Union for a Popular Movement politicians
The Republicans (France) politicians
La République En Marche! politicians
Mayors of places in Normandy
Government ministers of France
Secretaries of State of France
French Ministers of Defence
Members of the Borne government